Axel Zitzmann (born 21 February 1959) is an East German former ski jumper who competed from 1979 to 1981.

Career
He won silver medal at the FIS Ski Flying World Championships 1979 in Planica. Zitman's best World Cup event in ski jumping was third in the large hill event in 1981, also in Planica.

On 17 March 1979, he crashed as trial jumper at ski jumping world record distance at 179 metres (587 ft) on Velikanka bratov Gorišek K165 in Planica, Yugoslavia.

Invalid ski jumping world record

 Not recognized! Crash at world record distance.

References

External links 

1959 births
German male ski jumpers
Living people